"Sunny" is a soul jazz standard written by Bobby Hebb in 1963. It is one of the most performed and recorded popular songs, with hundreds of versions released. BMI rates "Sunny" No. 25 in its "Top 100 songs of the century".

Background and composition 

Hebb's parents, William and Ovalla Hebb, were both blind musicians. Hebb and his older brother Harold performed as a song-and-dance duo in Nashville, beginning when Bobby was three and Harold was nine. Hebb performed on a TV show hosted by country music record producer Owen Bradley.

Hebb wrote the song after his older brother, Harold, was stabbed to death outside a Nashville nightclub. Hebb was devastated by the event and many critics say it inspired the lyrics and tune. According to Hebb, he merely wrote the song as an expression of a preference for a "sunny" disposition over a "lousy" disposition following the murder of his brother.

Events influenced Hebb's songwriting, but his melody, crossing over into R&B (#3 on U.S. R&B chart) and Pop (#2 on U.S. Pop chart), together with the optimistic lyrics, came from the artist's desire to express that one should always "look at the bright side". Hebb has said about "Sunny": "All my intentions were to think of happier times and pay tribute to my brother – basically looking for a brighter day – because times were at a low. After I wrote it, I thought 'Sunny' just might be a different approach to what Johnny Bragg was talking about in 'Just Walkin' in the Rain.'"

Mieko Hirota version
"Sunny" was first recorded by Mieko "Miko" Hirota – the "Connie Francis of Japan" and Billy Taylor trio (feat. Ben Tucker and Grady Tate) on the Columbia records release "Miko in New York" (1965), recorded in New York. It was also released on the audio album Hit Kit Miko, Vol. 2 (October 20, 1965).

Dave Pike version
In America it was released by marimbaphonist Dave Pike on Atlantic Records in 1966 on the Jazz for the Jet Set album, recorded in New York City on October 26 and November 2, 1965. Grady Tate, who played drums on Mieko Hirotas version, also played on this version.

Bobby Hebb version
The personnel on the Bobby Hebb recording included Joe Shepley, Burt Collins on trumpet, Micky Gravine on trombone, Artie Kaplan and Joe Grimaldi on sax, Artie Butler on piano, Joe Renzetti and Al Gorgoni on guitar, Paul (PB) Brown and Joe Macho on bass, Al Rogers on drums and George Devens on percussion. The song was recorded while the session was in overtime; many of the studio musicians booked for that date had to leave early for other recording sessions. Joe Renzetti was the arranger.

"Sunny" was originally part of an 18-song demo recorded by producer Jerry Ross, also famous for Spanky and Our Gang, Keith's "98.6" and "Apple, Peaches, Pumpkin Pie" by Jay & the Techniques (Hebb was offered this song but didn't want to be considered a novelty act and let the song go to Jay Proctor).

"Sunny" was recorded at Bell Sound Studios in New York City and released as a single in 1966. It met with immediate success, which resulted in Hebb touring in 1966 with the Beatles. The song peaked at No. 2 on the Billboard Hot 100 chart in late August 1966.

Weekly charts

Year-end charts

Cher version
Cher recorded the song for her third solo LP Chér, an album of covers released in October 1966.  It was released as the third single off the album for the European and Asian markets, achieving success mostly in Scandinavian countries. It is considered to be a tribute to her then husband, Sonny Bono.

Weekly charts

Year-end charts

Sunny '76

"Sunny '76'" is a disco take on Bobby Hebb's song. Like the original 1966 version, it features Hebb; however, an updated disco beat was implemented with an eye to having it played in discos around the world. This version was arranged by Joe Renzetti, who also arranged the original record.

The 7-inch single was released in late 1975. The B-side featured another song of Hebb's called "Proud Soul Heritage".

Boney M. version

Euro disco group Boney M. recorded the song for their 1976 debut album, Take the Heat off Me, produced by Frank Farian and arranged by Stefan Klinkhammer in a Euro-disco arrangement. Following their breakthrough single "Daddy Cool", "Sunny" topped the German charts and reached the top ten in many other countries.

The single's B-side was "New York City", a reworked version of Gilla's (another Farian artist) 1976 hit single "Tu es!" and its English version "Why Don't You Do It", which had an intro borrowed from the Boney M. album track "Help Help". This was issued in some territories instead of "Baby Do You Wanna Bump" on "Take the Heat off Me".

The track was remixed and reissued several times in 1988, 1999 (it was a minor hit single in early 2000) and 2015, and was sampled by Boogie Pimps on their 2004 version. While Liz Mitchell sang the original lead vocals on Boney M.'s version, original member Maizie Williams recorded a solo version in 2006. The original version was also featured in the Umbrella Academy Season 2 soundtrack.

Charts

2000 remix

The final single from Boney M.'s remix album 20th Century Hits which peaked at #80 in the Swiss charts. The CD single was released with 8 mixes. A "London Mix" was released on the promotional double-12" single.

Other notable cover versions
 Frank Sinatra and Duke Ellington included a cover of the song on their 1968 jazz album Francis A. & Edward K. 
 Andy Williams covered the song on his 1967 album, Born Free. Due to the popularity of his version, it became a concert staple throughout his long performing career.
 Christophe Willem covered the song in 2006 (#3 in France, #9 in Belgium (Wallonia), #17 in Switzerland).
 American singer and songwriter Billie Eilish and her brother Finneas O'Connell covered the song as part of the TV special, One World: Together at Home.
 Jamie Jones of American R&B group, All-4-One covered the song in 2021.

References

External links
 http://sunnythesong.com/
 https://youtube.com/watch?v=5F5dm0Gnwl0

1965 songs
1966 singles
1976 singles
2000 singles
2006 singles
Boney M. songs
Georgie Fame songs
Cher songs
Stevie Wonder songs
Marvin Gaye songs
Christophe Willem songs
Song recordings produced by Frank Farian
Cashbox number-one singles
Number-one singles in Austria
Number-one singles in Belgium
Number-one singles in France
Number-one singles in Germany
Dutch Top 40 number-one singles
Number-one singles in Norway
Imperial Records singles
Hansa Records singles
Polydor Records singles
Philips Records singles
Atlantic Records singles
Atco Records singles
Bertelsmann Music Group singles
Songs inspired by deaths
Songs about the assassination of John F. Kennedy